Sinthee or Sinthi is a neighbourhood of North Kolkata in Kolkata district, West Bengal, India.

History
The East India Company obtained from the Mughal emperor Farrukhsiyar, in 1717, the right to rent from 38 villages surrounding their settlement. Of these 5 lay across the Hooghly in what is now Howrah district. The remaining 33 villages were on the Calcutta side. After the fall of Siraj-ud-daulah, the last independent Nawab of Bengal, it purchased these villages in 1758 from Mir Jafar and reorganised them. These villages were known en-bloc as Dihi Panchannagram and Sinthee was one of them. It was considered to be a suburb beyond the limits of the Maratha Ditch.

Geography

Location
Sinthee is surrounded by Dum Dum and South Dum Dum in the east, Satpukur and Dum Dum Road in the south, Baranagar in the north,  Cossipore & Barrackpore Trunk Road in the west.

Police district
Sinthee police station is part of the North and North Suburban division of Kolkata Police. Located at 145/1 South Sinthi Road, Kolkata-700050, it has jurisdiction over Sinthee neighbourhood/ Ward No. 2 of Kolkata Municipal Corporation.

Amherst Street Women police station covers all police districts under the jurisdiction of the North and North Suburban division i.e. Amherst Street, Jorabagan, Shyampukur, Cossipore, Chitpur, Sinthi, Burtolla and Tala.

Landmarks
 Rabindra Bharati University
 B. T. Road Government Sponsored H. S. School
 Birla Institute of Technology
 Department of Economics, University of Calcutta

Transport

Road
B.T. Road passes along the west boundary of Sinthee. Many buses ply through 'Sinthee More' on B.T. Road. The only bus (Private bus) which enters into Sinthee is 30A (Sinthee Bediapara - Esplanade (Dharmatala), which runs along KC Ghosh Road (Ramakrishna Ghosh Road).

Train
Dum Dum Junction is the nearest railway station of Sinthee. Dum Dum Metro Station is the neighborhood subway station.

External links

References

Neighbourhoods in Kolkata